August Theodor Heinrich Ribbe (June, 13, 1832 Berlin - January,  19, 1898) was a German entomologist.

Heinrich Ribbe was an insect dealer in Dresden and Berlin. In 1876  he collected trade insects in the Crimea and in 1878 he collected for Otto Staudinger and Andreas Bang-Haas in Panama and Chiriqui. His private collection is in the State Museum of Zoology, Dresden. His entomologist interest and profession was passed to his son Carl Ribbe.

References
 Groll, E. K. (Hrsg.): Biografien der Entomologen der Welt : Datenbank. Version 4.15 : Senckenberg Deutsches Entomologisches Institut, 2010 
 Ribbe family private archive

German entomologists
Scientists from Dresden
1832 births
1898 deaths